Alexander Toroitich Kiprotich (born 10 October 1994) is a Kenyan javelin thrower.

He won the gold medal at the 2013 African Junior Championships, finished seventh at the 2014 African Championships, fourth at the 2015 African Games, seventh at the 2015 Military World Games, won the bronze medal at the 2016 African Championships, finished fifth at the 2018 African Championships and eleventh at the 2018 Commonwealth Games. He also competed at the 2014 Commonwealth Games without reaching the final.

His personal best throw is 78.84 metres, achieved in May 2015 in Eldoret.

References

1994 births
Living people
Kenyan male javelin throwers
Athletes (track and field) at the 2014 Commonwealth Games
Athletes (track and field) at the 2018 Commonwealth Games
Commonwealth Games competitors for Kenya
Athletes (track and field) at the 2015 African Games
Athletes (track and field) at the 2019 African Games
African Games competitors for Kenya
African Games medalists in athletics (track and field)
African Games silver medalists for Kenya